Kyffhäuserland is a municipality in the district Kyffhäuserkreis, in Thuringia, Germany. It was formed on 31 December 2012 by the merger of the former municipalities Badra, Bendeleben, Göllingen, Günserode, Hachelbich, Rottleben, Seega and Steinthaleben.

References

Municipalities in Thuringia
Kyffhäuserkreis